Benjamin Edelin (born 23 February 1993) is a French male track cyclist, representing France at international competitions. He competed at the 2016 UEC European Track Championships in the 1 km time trial event.

References

1993 births
Living people
French male cyclists
French track cyclists
Place of birth missing (living people)
21st-century French people